Ready for Love is an American reality matchmaking competition television series that aired for three weeks on NBC in 2013 and six subsequent weeks on NBC.com. The series was scheduled to air Tuesdays from 9:00pm to 11:00pm Eastern and Pacific time, and premiered in that slot on Tuesday, April 9, 2013. It was hosted by Giuliana Rancic and Bill Rancic. The show featured three bachelors and includes three matchmakers and a field of 36 bachelorettes.

On April 19, 2013, after two low-rated episodes, NBC pulled the Eva Longoria produced Ready for Love from its schedule. The last episode to air on NBC was the April 23 segment. The remaining six episodes were placed online on Tuesdays via the network's website, Hulu, the network's cable video on demand service, and iTunes and Amazon Video for purchase, until the June 4 finale.

Programming
Episodes of Ready for Love run for two hours, and the series debuted on April 9, 2013. It was placed on the Tuesday schedule where it aired immediately after The Voice. It had originally been planned for a Sunday night slot as the lead-in to The Apprentice before NBC reshuffled its spring 2013 schedule; the Tuesday time slot was regarded as an upgrade because The Voice is a strong lead-in, and the network hoped the show would attract the viewers who had previously watched The Bachelor on Tuesdays.

Show structure
The show was a matchmaking show with the goal of finding romantic partners for three eligible bachelors. Producer Eva Longoria selected the bachelors for the show: Dallas-based financier Ben Patton, Santa Barbara-based Plain White T's member Tim Lopez and Miami-based entrepreneur Ernesto Argüello. Eligible women applied online to matchmakers Amber Kelleher-Andrews, Tracy McMillan and Matthew Hussey.  Each of the three bachelors had a field of twelve bachelorettes that were chosen for him: each matchmaker selected four women per bachelor. The women applied via a specially designed Facebook app that introduced the participants via a Ready For Love Facebook page as well as a Facebook timeline. The intent was that as the season evolved, each of the three bachelors would find a romantic partner from among the twelve bachelorettes chosen for him while the audience observed the process.

Contestants

Elimination chart

Key 

 Matchmaker Matthew Hussey's team.
 Matchmaker Amber Kelleher-Andrews' team.
 Matchmaker Tracy McMillan's team.

 The contestant won the competition.
 The contestant did well enough to not be put in the Bottom 3 or Bottom 2.
 The contestant was in the Bottom 3, but was saved.
 The contestant was chosen by the Matchmakers to be in the Bottom 3.
 The contestant was chosen by the Matchmakers to be in the Bottom 2.
 The contestant was chosen by the Men to be in the Bottom 2 or 3.
 The contestant was eliminated.

Reception
Sonia Saraiya of The A.V. Club gave the premiere episode an "F" grade, calling it "a catastrophe of a television show", "pure evil", "boring, superficial, and bland" and its treatment of the contestants "despicable".

Ratings
Despite aggressive promotion and having The Voice as a lead-in, its premiere only brought in 3.67 million viewers with a 1.5 rating. In terms of viewership, only 27.6% of its lead-in stayed to watch it. In terms of the 18–49 category, it only retained 34.1% of its lead in.

Episodes

International airing 
  - The series premiered in Australia on Channel Seven on December 27, on a Saturday afternoon at 12:30pm
  - The series premiered in South Africa on SABC 3  (South African Broadcasting Corporation) on 8 April 2020, airing Wednesday evening 19:30pm

References

External links

 
 Ready for Love at The Futon Critic
 

2010s American reality television series
2013 American television series debuts
2013 American television series endings
American dating and relationship reality television series
English-language television shows
NBC original programming
Television series by Universal Television